Seme may refer to:
Seme Border, a settlement in Nigeria on the border with Benin
Seme (dagger), a Maasai term for a type of lion hunting knife
Seme (martial arts), Japanese martial arts term meaning to attack
Seme, a manga/anime term for a dominant partner in a homosexual relationship, derived from the martial arts term
Seme (semantics), a small unit of meaning identified as one characteristic of a sememe
Pixley ka Isaka Seme (1881?-June 1951) a founding member of the African National Congress
Semé, a term used in heraldry to describe a field filled with charges
SEME, an acronym for the search engine manipulation effect
8 Training Battalion of the British Army's Royal Electrical and Mechanical Engineers, formerly known as the School of Electrical and Mechanical Engineering (SEME)

See also
Seam (disambiguation)
Seim (disambiguation)